Arnon Nampa (also spelt Anon Numpa; born 18 August 1984) is a Thai human rights lawyer and activist. He is renowned in Thailand for openly criticizing the monarchy of Thailand, breaking the country's taboo. He was initially regarded as a prominent human rights defender during his tenure as a human rights lawyer and later accumulated multiple criminal charges due to his active involvement in pro-democracy activism. He is considered to be one of the leading figures of the 2020–2021 Thai protests, co-leading reforms to the monarchy reform movement by non-elite people for first time in Thai history.

He was detained without trial in 2020 for 24 days but after Prime Minister Prayuth Chan-o-cha declared to use all laws including Lèse-majesté to the protesters in November 2020, he had been detained for 110 days in first round of remanding. After he received bail just 2 months from June 2021, he had been imprisoned again from 9 August 2021 to 27 February 2022, without trial for 203 days. His total imprisonment time between 2020 and 2022 is 337 days.

Early life

Rot Et: 1984–2003
Arnon Nampa was born on 18 August 1984 in Thung Khao Luang, former Thawat Buri in a family background rich in agriculture in Roi Et Province. His parents were rice farmers. He studied for secondary education at a top provincial school, Roi Et Wittayalai, gained the nickname "The Little Communist" for his rebellious actions. He wrote a poem, papered all over the school's walls to rebuke and criticize teachers and friends that cooperated tutoring on extra private classes. He protested and collected a list of students that disagreed with class-time change because it would make rural students miss commuting back to their houses.

At that time, the first three-year at his school did not accept female students, but he promised to the students to change that, made him elected as a student council president in 2002. In his presidential year, he presented the 6 October 1976 massacre content on a school board and started 'Sports event: women school - Roi Et school'. He also won the first place in the northeast region for the law questionnaire student competition in that year. Chamlong Daoruang, Roi Et Wittayalai alumni and Free Thai Movement member, was his influencer in his early years.

Arriving in Bangkok: 2003–2007
Having interest in a poetry, he chose the Thai language program in the Faculty of Education of Mahasarakham University in 2003, but the environment did not induce him enough, so he did not enroll. Reading a lot of history of Thammasat University, he sought to be in the Faculty of Sociology and Anthropology Thammasat University, but after two months he decided to leave and studied a law at Ramkhamhaeng University instead.

In 2005, Arnon and most student activists supported People's Alliance for Democracy in 2005–2006 Thai political crisis at the beginning, anti-authoritarian of Thaksin Shinawatra. During 2006 Thai coup d'état, he turned to be anti-coup activist and joined Sombat Bunngam-anong's 19 September Network against Coup d'Etat group as reciting poetry role. He also joined the 'black shirt' protest led by Giles Ji Ungpakorn.

After Arnon graduated with a law degree in 2006, he was conscripted to military for one year by catching a red lottery. In 2007, he passed an exam for a lawyer license before his service ended. He won the first case at Military courts of Thailand which his first client was a drafted military colleague.

Human rights lawyer

Red shirts lawyer: 2007–2010
Arnon started lawyer internship in 2007 at EnLAW Thai Foundation by Surachai Trongngam, practicing human rights defend cases such as Sahaviriya steel mill project protests in Bang Saphan District, police crackdown on Thai-Malay gas pipeline project protest, and Charoen Wat-akson assassination-related Bo-Nok and Ban-Krut coal power plant protest, gained him an awareness of problems over human rights violation to people. In 2008, his internship ended and he went out on a trial by himself. He received a barrister degree from the Thai Bar Association in 2009.

Amid the Centre for Resolution of Emergency Situation, army group that took over the country after the 2010 red shirts crackdown occurring, Arnon became Sombat Bunngam-anong's the Red Sunday Group's lawyer, named by some media as 'Red Sunday lawyer'. His ability in handling the court cases earned him the nickname of 'lawyer for the Red Shirts'. He became a lawyer of the monarchy defamation cases because of the political crisis, red shirt activists who disagreed with the 2010 coup were charged with lèse-majesté. His early help on the cases were Chotisak Onsoong case, Suwicha Thakor case.

Ratsadornprasong Law Office: 2011–2014
In 2011, Arnon started his pro bono law practice, the 'Ratsadornprasong Law Office', with other two lawyers to help red-shirts protesters for almost 100 cases, and people who had been charged with lèse-majesté from a political conflict. The firm notable cases and works were the burning of the Mukdahan Provincial Offices case with over twenty defendants, charges were dismissed later in 2019. His firm also helped poor defendant families' welfares and a reparation on other detained red shirts defendants. He helped in the 'Uncle SMS' Ampon Tangnoppakul case, Thantawut or 'Noom Rednont', Joe Gordon on a translation of The King Never Smiles book. The firm helped operating the People's Information Center: The April-May 2010 Crackdowns (PIC) and involved in 'Nuamthong' movie

The firm ended in 2013 because the political crisis was unfolding before the 2014 Thai coup d'état occurred. It became 'Ratsadornprasong fund' to bail out political activists from strict military regime prosecution and it has been helped political activists until today.

Two days after the 2014 Thai coup d'état, Arnon and lawyer friends found Thai Lawyers for Human Rights (TLHR) to tackle with arrested, summoned, detained by the military junta, including cases in military court. He positioned himself to be a freelance lawyer and receiving cases from TLHR. Later, he pursued a career as a human rights lawyer and went onto to defend court cases on behalf of prominent high-profile activists, including Aekachai Hongkangwan, Phai Dao-din.

Early activism

Resistant Citizen: 2014–2017
Arnon co-founded the Resistant Citizen group in January 2015 after he organized many experiment protests and the 'Coup Down People Rise 2015' party, a symbolic event at the Democracy Monument on 31 December 2014. The group released a couple of YouTube parodies and performance arts about the coup, in which he played the main role in 'Chub Yei Chan-O-Cha' (Kiss to mock the moon O-Cha). The moon in Thai is 'Chan', he dressed Prayut Chan-o-cha military uniform in the parody music video.

The Resistant Citizen group set up the 'Election that We (Love) was Stolen' event at Bangkok Art and Culture Centre on Valentine's Day, 14 February. They wanted to create a space where people can speak their minds after the National Council for Peace and Order (NCPO), the military junta came to silence Thai people for almost a year. They staged a mock election to recall the 2 Feb 2014 election which was rescinded, attracting about 300 people. Arnon, Siravich Sereethiwat, Punsak Srithep, and Wannakiat Chusuwan were arrested and charged by Army Col Burin Thongprapai with violating the military junta order prohibiting an assembly of more than five people. He was bailed out after being detained one night at Phayathai police station. He gained a lot of attention from the news, "Many months have passed, half of my friends in a jail, other half fled to other countries." when asking about the pressure he got after an arrest. He was also charged under a computer crime laws for Facebook messages he posted.

His group organized another event in March 2015, 'I Walk Therefore, I Am'. Arnon and another 3 defendants walked 3 days from Bangbuathong to Patumwan police station to protest that civilians should not face military court. It was called the landmark case from the Human Right Watch that could shake strict military rule.

Arnon was arrested a second time in 2015, on the train traveling from Bangkok Noi to Rajabhakti Park, led by Siravich of the Democracy Studies Group. The campaign "Taking a train to Rajabhakti Park to throw light on graft techniques" is to look into alleged corruption during park construction. Army troops intercepted a train carrying student activists and disconnected their carriage from the train at Ban Pong Station, Ratchaburi. He and other 37 activists were taken to the National Office of Buddhism in Phutthamonthon park, later in the night, they were released. He was detained in Bangkok Remand Prison on 25 April 2016 by the court prosecution of a military judge advocate, Col.Burin Thongprapai, complainant, and later released by bail. At the end of 2019, the court withdrew an accusation.

On 31 October 2015, he was charged under Public Assembly Act for using an amplifier without permission during the activity to recognize the death of Nuamthong Praiwan. He was fined for 200 baht by Pol Col Attawit Saisueb, Deputy Chief of Metropolitan Police Division One.

On 19 and 27 April 2016, he and the Resistan Citizen group invited people to stand, literally, at the Victory Monument to protest military harassment against activists. He and other 15 activists were arrested for a Protesting Act violation on both days. In 2019, the court ordered fining him 1,000 baht.

Aside from activism, he took on a lot of lese majeste cases that spiking in the year after the coup, such as '30 years in jail' for posting insulting to the monarchy. He was also a lawyer of Thanakorn Siripaiboon who was charged with infamous lese majeste related to the King's dog, 'Tongdaeng', and Siravich's mother, who was charged 15 years in prison for 'Ja' Facebook message reply. Thanet Anantawong, the Dao Din group, and Jatupat Boonpattararaksa were also his clients.

In late 2017, continuing working as a human rights activist, he communicated human rights stories on his Facebook account and eventually criticized the court for punishing his particular group of clients by restricting them from seeing each other. He said that the court had no right to order that. On 5 December, he was charged with violating the Computer Crime Act and contempt of court by Lt.Col.Supharat Kam-in. He denied all charges and believed it was politically motivated against exercising rights to freedom of expression. Human rights NGOs demanded military junta to stop a strategic litigation against public participation (SLAPPs). Front Line Defenders condemned the military junta on judicial harassment of him, strongly believed it was linked to his human rights lawyer duty, and demanded junta drop all charges against him.

Demanding an election: 2018–2019

On 27 January 2018, a group of activists demanding a general election, Arnon, Sirawit Seritiwat, Nutta Mahattana, Rangsiman Rome, Netiwit Chotiphatphaisal, Ekachai Hongkangwan, and  Sukrid Peansuwan were charged at Pratumwan Skywalk with political gatherings more than four and committed acts of incitement against the state by the same person who charged him in 2015, Col.Burin Thongprapai.

On 10 February 2018, Arnon, Sirivich, and Rangsiman led 200-500 protesters at the Democracy Monument to demand a general election within the year 2018 and to criticize Prayut and Prawit Wongsuwan. The police charged him and 6 individuals that the authorities are seen as the leader and had informed sedition accusation under the order of the head of NCPO no.3/2015. On 23 July 2019, the charge was drop.

He and activists organized a political rally of the people who want an election at the army headquarter and the UN Building on 24 March and 22 May 2018, the authorities also informed sedition accusation to him. Later in October, he was charged again on the Computer Crime Act for sharing Rajaphakti plan and pressing the like button to Tongdeang the King's dog parody case in Facebook.

On 6 January 2019, he led a demonstration calling to stop postponing a general election at the Victory Monument. After 2019 Thai general election ended, he protested every day for a week to Office of Election Commission of Thailand which prosecuting critics that criticized counting process and confused initial results by just standing. Unofficial results, which typically would be known by the same night and announced the next morning, were repeatedly delayed for 44 days.

Reforms to the monarchy: 2019–2020

Prologue
On 30 September 2019, King Maha Vajiralongkorn ordered an emergency decree as a result two infantry regiments were removed from the Royal Thai Army's chain of command and placed under the Royal Security Command to consolidate his personal authority. All personnel, assets, and operating budgets were likewise transferred to the agency. On 14 October, Arnon posted an open letter to the House of Representatives on Facebook, urged to open a discussion and vote on disapproval of it. He explained it was contrary to Article 172 of the Constitution because it is not an urgent matter and it is an extension of the military power of the monarchy that would break the democratic system, which normally military power should be under the cabinet executive to be able to check and balance by the National Assembly of Thailand and the Judiciary of Thailand. Later, an emergency decree passed but 70 representatives from Future Forward Party which later dissolved by the  Constitutional Court led by Piyabutr Saengkanokkul voted against it.

On 16 June 2020, after he was accused of Computer Crime violation again by an unknown person, posting about the monarchy budget on Facebook. He filed a letter to Prayuth Chan-O-Cha, demanded to explain and investigate the monarchy budget, and urged to distribute a fraction of it to the COVID-19 pandemic crisis.

On 24 June, Arnon and the DRG organized a pre-dawn protest at the Democracy Monument across the nation, to commemorate the 1932 revolt which ended the absolute monarchy and started democracy system. These events were trending number 1 on a Twitter platform but later they were charged with several minor violations.

On 18 July, the student group Free Youth Movement organized a public demonstration that drew more than 2,000 protesters at the Democracy Monument. He reminded protesters to support prisoners convicted under the lèse-majesté law, and Tiwagorn Withiton who posted a picture of himself wearing the viral "I lost faith in the monarchy" t-shirt then was forcibly admitted to a psychiatric hospital. He called for the  dissolution of parliament because of an unfair election and dissolving of the Future Forward Party, for officials to stop threatening citizens, and drafting a new constitution that appointing 250 junta senators to vote for himself to be prime minister. Later on 20 July, he addressed in front of the Royal Thai Army, demanded the army to stop harassing activists, repeal the junta senate, and stop a coup amnesty.

Breaking the taboo

In mid-2020, despite openly criticizing the monarchy and protesting on social media was active, such as Tiwagorn case, but no one had tried in public speaking. Eventually, on Monday evening of 3 August 2020, Arnon Nampa openly criticized the monarchy in front of 200 protesters dressed as a wizard for a Harry Potter-themed protest at the Democracy Monument. It was regarded as the first time in Thai history, calling for the monarchy powers to be curbed in unusually frank public speech. Only Somsak Jeamteerasakul had done it but in closed academic seminars and public articles, other case is Daranee Charnchoengsilpakul comments against the monarchy during a speech at the United Front for Democracy Against Dictatorship political rally in 2008 Thai political crisis.

He stressed that he wanted to reform the constitutional monarchy, not overthrow, and focusing on the asset transfer from the Crown Property Bureau to the personal belonging of the King. He also questioned the King's decision to transfer two military units to his command which was not a democratic, constitutional monarchy. He accused King Maha Vajiralongkorn of creating unprecedented changes in the constitution. He told the media that he spoke candidly, to honor his integrity, the integrity of the audience, and out of respect for the monarchy.

On 5 August, Apiwat Kanthong, the lawyer of Prayuth Chan-O-Cha, filed a complaint for the crime of lèse-majesté and removing him from a member of the Lawyers Council. On 7 August, the Samranrat Police arrested him and Panupong Jadnok with sedition after the 18 July, Free Youth protest. Later that day Arnon and Panupong were dragged by police officers from the Criminal Court to a police vehicle and taken to the Huai Khwang Police Station. He and Panupong were released by bail on the evening of 8 August by the Criminal Court order. On the next day, he continued giving out speech again in the Chiang Mai protest.

He gave an interview later that the students wanted to do this before but they asked him to start the movement. He told that a reaction from the protesters and the police were thrilled, silent, and worried about him. Some media deleted live streaming of his speech.

Revolutionary rally
A week later from the historic speech from Arnon, on 10 August 2020, there was a revolutionary rally at Thammasat University, regarding by BBC analyst, Rangsit campus in Pathum Thani Province named "ธรรมศาสตร์จะไม่ทน." (lit. Thammasat will not tolerate.). Penguin or Parit Chiwarak wrote the revolutionary 10 monarchy reform manifestos, adapted from Somsak Jeamteerasakul writing and let Panusaya Sithijirawattanakul readout, without fear from abduction and murder. In front of more than 1,000 protesters, Arnon also repeatedly gave out a monarchy reform speech again.

Despite monarchy reforms demand protest earlier, 7 days later in the biggest anti-government protest on 17 August by the Free Youth group was different. They demanded only the government to resign, to dissolve the parliament and to hold a new general election under a revised constitution. Drawing more than 20,000 people at the Democracy Monument, Arnon said about "the biggest dream of seeing the monarchy stay alongside Thai society", rather than unattached above it.

He was arrested again on 19 August at night for sedition, Assembly Act, Computer Crime Act on Harry Potter-themed speech. He spent a night in Chanasongkram Police Station, was released on bail in the morning. The police searched his house to find illegal evidence but found nothing. On 25 August, he was arrested again for sedition over his speech on 10 August and was released on bail. Later 1 September, he reported that the state official harassed him by visiting his grandmother house.

On 3 September 2020, the court revoked the bail appeal of Arnon and Panupong Jadnok, and they were remanded until further notice. The court ruled that both of them had breached their bail terms by taking part in protests. Arnon was immediately re-detained, the court justified this on the theory "in order to prevent the offender to cause other harms." Being detained for 5 days, on September 7, the police withdrew the request. He and Panupong were released. The Clooney Foundation for Justice called it an unlawful bail condition.

Eventually, Arnon, Panupong, Panusaya, Parit, and prominent activists such as Pai Dao Din, organized 19-20 September protest at front of the Grand Palace's Sanam Luang drawing around 18,000 - 50,000 protesters, established main goal of 2020-2021 Thai protests, to curbing the palace's powers. He was regarded as one of the leaders since then. He repeated his monarchy reform goal "Unless the monarchy is under the constitution, we will never achieve true democracy," and "the country belongs to the people, not the monarchy". The leaders placed a commemorative brass plaque, 'second Khana Ratsadon plaque', to remind the 1932 revolution that ended absolute monarchy. They have been called 'Ratsadon' by media.

Ratsadon
On Wednesday 14 October, the 47th anniversary of a major student-led 1973 Thai popular uprising, Arnon and other Ratsadon leaders organized a marching protest to the Government House, drawing around 8,000 protesters. It was a general strike planned by them. He led a mass on the truck from the Democracy Monument. Later on the morning of 15 October, he was forcibly taken by a special commando unit without a lawyer to the Chiang Mai Police Station, facing sedition charges by Apiwat Kanthong, Prayuth Chan-O-Cha's lawyer, complaining to Pol. Col. Phuwanat Duangdee for a speech on stage about the monarchy in Chiang Mai and Pathum Thani.

On 16 October, he wrote on a plain paper to the court that a judicial process, order, judging are unfair. He had believed in Thai judicial before, so he decided to study law. But in his experiences, he found that a judicial process is a part of a dictatorship. He believes that someday the court will rethink about it and get back to stand with Thai society. The protest escalated on 16 October when the police fired a water cannon at a large crowd at the Pathumwan intersection.

He had been detained at Chiang Mai Central Prison until 27 October, he was released by 200,000 baht bail but Pol Lt Col Chok-amnuay Wongboonrit, Chana Songkhram police, arrested him straight away for sedition and ruining archaeological site in '19-20 September protest'. He was then taken to the Bangkok Remand Prison. In the evening, the Criminal Court denied bail for him on the grounds that he might cause unrest.

Being in prison for 19 days since 15 October, he was released on the midnight 2 November along with political activists, Somyot Prueksakasemsuk, and Ekkachai Hongkangwan, making him a jail time total 24 days this year without the court verdict.

On 17 November, Arnon and Rasadon group led the protesters to the Sappaya-Sapasathan parliament, to pressure on parliament to accept the constitution amendment bill sponsored by civil group iLaw. The police used the water cannon to fire a teargas liquid, causing many protesters injured. At the end, the police ran back and let the mass gather in front of the parliament. He called demonstrators to gather at Ratchaprasong Intersection on 18 November, he said to fight face to face to the monarchy. That day, the protesters sprayed a paint around the police headquarter, insulting the monarchy.

Lèse-majesté strikes
On 19 November, Prayuth Chan-o-cha promised to use 'all laws' against the protesters, including Lèse-majesté law or Article 112, but the protests had  taken place almost every day from October to November. Arnon was also received a summons for lese majeste in addition to other charges. Clooney Foundation for Justice Initiative called on the Thai government to dismiss these charges against him and others to stop sanctions on free speech and peaceful assembly.

Arnon and the Ratsadon led the protesters to protest at SCB banking company owned by Vajiralongkorn on 25 November, Bangkok army barrack on 29 November. All venues were related to reforms to the monarchy. On 3 December, he still spoke directly to the king that he should stay in 'the King can do no wrong' idea. He stated to take a break during New Year's holidays and will continue the rally in 2021 with more escalation.

On 14 January 2021, Arnon was recognized by the South Korea's May 18 Memorial Foundation by winning the 2021 Gwangju Prize for Human Rights from his human rights legal contribution, anti-authoritarian activisms and his call for the monarchy reform. He is the third person from Thailand after Angkhana Neelaphaijit and Pai Dao Din.

Imprisonment without trial: 2021–2022

Bangkok Remand Prison: February–June 2021
Nevertheless, on 9 February 2021, Arnon and the Ratsadon group Parit, Patipan Luecha, and Somyot were arrested and detained again, charges of lese majeste and 10 other offenses, including sedition, over 19-20 September protest by Pol Lt Col Chok-amnuay Wongboonrit, Chana Songkhram police. The court denied them bail, remanded them in the Bangkok Remand Prison. US National Security Advisor Jake Sullivan expressed concern. United Nations human rights experts condemned on rising lese-majeste cases. After the Court of Appeal, The court rejected a request and cited their disrespect for the monarchy and they posed a flight risk. In front of Bangkok Remand Prison, Prachak Kongkirati, Yukti Mukdawichit, Boonlert Wisetpreecha from Thammasat University and Puangthong Pawakrapan from Chulalongkorn University claiming to represent 255 lecturers at 31 universities and educations read out a statement calling for their release. Human Rights Watch said that the country may returns to the dark days by abusing the law and demanded the Thai government to conform with Thailand's international human rights law obligations.

His lawyers tried to appeal many occasions but all were denied with the same reason by the court. By the time, he was jailed awaiting trial. He was prosecuted for 21 cases, 11 of lese majeste cases.

On 15 March, Arnon wrote the petition, fear of death threat, to the Criminal Court while he was temporarily released to perform his lawyer duty, that prison officials tried four times to take Jatupat and Panupong out to test COVID-19 at night which was an unusual time. Arnon found it suspicious and there was rumours that they will be sent to hurt or kill.

On 8 April, Arnon, Jatupat and Somyot signed a letter expressing their intention to withdraw their lawyer from the trial because he cited lack of due fairness in the court so was therefore no longer required to defend them. While Patipan was released by bail, Parit and Panusaya had committed hunger strike until he get a bail.

Arnon infected with the coronavirus in custody and sent to the prison hospital on 6 May.

110 days after being detained without the court verdict, on 6 June, he was given bail 200,000 baht on conditions that include refraining from defaming the monarchy and inciting non-peaceful event along with Panupong. He was immediately treated in hospital after he had infected the coronavirus.

He resumed activism on 24 June event by reading 'Prakat Khana Ratsadon', a declaration on the Siamese revolution of 1932.

Bangkok Remand Prison: August 2021–February 2022

On 3 August, Arnon Nampa gave a critical speech once again on the front of Bangkok Art and Culture Centre to commemorate 'Harry Potter themed' last year. This time he demanded a revoke of Article 112 law and transferring of public asset from the King back to the previous status. He was imprisoned on 9 August for lese majeste charges.

On 10 November, the Constitutional Court ruled that Arnon's speech, calling for reforms of the monarchy in 'Thammasat will not tolerate' rally on 10 August 2020, aimed to overthrow the state and the monarchy in their speeches. The court ordered him and other protest groups to end all monarchy reform movements, as Arnon never had a chance to prove the wrongdoing in the court because he had been in the jail.

On 28 February 2022, Arnon received bails from all courts after he had been detained for 203 days. His total imprisonment time between 2020 and 2022 is 337 days.

Personality and personal life
Born in a rice field, he often recalled a natural and rural feeling of a rice field and agriculture. He convinced himself to be 'Arnon' in Caravan 'phleng phuea chiwit' album 'Arnon' (1988), Sai Sima character in Seni Saowaphong novel Pisat (1994), characters in Komtuan Khantanu and Naowarat Pongpaiboon's books. His Facebook profile photo was Chit Phumisak.

Poetry & art works
In 2011, he wrote a poetry collection book, 'Mute and blind, at the end of the line', about the 2010 red shirts massacre. His book was nominated to S.E.A. Write Award in 2013.

He performed Khlui (Thai Flute) in Thai activist band Faiyen's 'Farmer' song. Khlui was his instrument for his student activism.

Awards and honors 
Jarupong Thongsin for Democracy Award, Thailand (2020)
Gwangju Prize for Human Rights , Korea (2021)

See also 
 2020–2021 Thai protests
 Human rights in Thailand
 Lèse-majesté in Thailand
 Panusaya Sithijirawattanakul

References

External links 
 

1984 births
Arnon Nampa
Living people
Arnon Nampa
Arnon Nampa
Arnon Nampa
Arnon Nampa
Arnon Nampa
Arnon Nampa
Arnon Nampa
Arnon Nampa
Arnon Nampa
Arnon Nampa
Arnon Nampa
Arnon Nampa
Arnon Nampa